4-Fluoro-5-Methoxy-N,N-dimethyltryptamine (4-F-5-MeO-DMT) was first described by David E. Nichols team in 2000. It is a potent 5-HT1A agonist. Substitution with the 4-fluorine markedly increased 5-HT1A selectivity over 5-HT2A/2C receptors with potency greater than that of the 5-HT1A agonist 8-OH-DPAT.

The analog compound with the N,N-dialkyl substituents constrained into a pyrrolidine ring, is a slightly stronger agonist for the 5-HT1A receptor and retains the selectivity over the 5-HT2A/2C receptors.

See also 
 4-HO-5-MeO-DMT
 5-Fluoro-AMT
 6-Fluoro-DMT
 7F-5-MeO-MET

References 

Psychedelic tryptamines
Serotonin receptor agonists